Lesbian, gay, bisexual, and transgender (LGBT) people in Aceh face legal challenges and prejudices not experienced by non-LGBT residents. Since 2014, at least six men have been publicly caned for having gay sex, including two men who received 77 lashes in 2021.

Gender identity and expression 
The Qanun Law No.6 in 2014 does not explicitly prohibits crossdressing, even though Transgender women had been targeted by the police several times. One of the cases was an arrest of 12 transgender individuals in the North Aceh regency in 2018 under the command of Untung Sangaji. The transgenders were denuded and forced to be "dressed into men", while the salon where they worked were also closed. This action drew criticism from the National Human Rights Commission because it was considered degrading their human dignity and contrary to existing regulations.

References

See also 
 LGBT rights in Indonesia
 LGBT rights in Malaysia
 LGBT rights in Asia
 LGBT rights by country or territory

Aceh
Aceh